HMS Starling, pennant number U66, was a Modified Black Swan-class sloop of the Royal Navy. She was active in the Battle of the Atlantic during the Second World War and was the most successful anti-submarine warfare vessel of the Royal Navy, being credited with the destruction of fourteen U-boats.

Construction
Starling was ordered on 18 July 1941 under the 1940 Supplementary War Building Programme; she was laid down by Fairfield Shipbuilding and Engineering Company at Govan, Scotland, on 21 October 1941. She was launched on 14 October 1942, and commissioned on 1 April 1943, with a build time of 17 months and 10 days.

Service history
Starling joined Western Approaches Command in April 1943 under the command of Captain Frederic John Walker, leader of the 2nd Support Group (2SG). This was a flotilla of six sloops not tied down to convoy protection, but free to hunt down U-boats wherever found.

Starlings first patrol in May 1943 was uneventful; There were several major convoy battles during the month, but none involving 2 SG. Starlings first success came on 1 June 1943, when the group's first U-boat was detected: fortuitously on a fine day and identified by a Lt. Earl Howe Pitt. This event was dubbed another "Glorious First of June" by Walker. Over a 15-hour period the group found, tracked and destroyed , in the longest hunt of the Atlantic campaign up to that point,

On their return to Liverpool, Starling and 2SG were assigned to "Operation Musketry", an attempt, in concert with Coastal Command, to interdict the U-boat transit routes across the Bay of Biscay. On 24 June 1943 the group was successful in destroying two U-boats; Starling destroyed , but was damaged when she rammed the U-boat to dispatch it. She was forced to return to Britain for repairs, under the temporary command of Cdr. DEG Wemyss of Wild Goose, Walker having stayed with the group.

In October, on returning to the group, Starling was involved in the battle around convoy ON 207.  No successes were recorded, though the convoy battle saw three U-boats destroyed, with no ships lost.

In December, while in support of SL 140/MKS 31, Starling attacked and damaged , forcing it to abandon its attack.

In February she took part in the famous "Six in one trip" episode, where 2 SG destroyed six U-boats over a two-week period.

In March 1944, Starling and 2 SG, accompanied by escort carrier Vindex, sought and destroyed , a U-boat on weather-reporting duty in the North Atlantic.
Later that month, while supporting Murmansk convoy JW 58, Starling met and destroyed  in transit to the North Atlantic. She had no other success, though three U-boats were destroyed in attacks on JW 58.

Though starting from 300 miles away Walker, in an inspired piece of work, divined where to search and after a three-day search gained contact. An 18-hour hunt brought U-473 to the surface, where she was sunk by gunfire.

In June Starling was part of "Operation Neptune" in support of the Normandy landings, and was instrumental in preventing any attacks on the invasion fleet. In all fifteen U-boats were destroyed in attempts to attack the invasion fleet, though Starling herself had no success.

In July Starling suffered her heaviest blow when Capt. FJ Walker died of a cerebral haemorrhage, brought on by overwork and exhaustion.

Under her new captain, Cdr.

In September Starling moved to 22EG, under Cdr. GWE Castens, but the U-boat war had changed character, and Starling saw little further success. The campaign became a hunt for single raiders operating in the shallow coastal waters, where a U-boat could hide among the wrecks on the sea bottom. Hunts for these "lone wolves" was a slow and tedious business, though merchant ship losses were kept to a minimum.

However this assessment was re-evaluated in 1991, and the credit withdrawn;  the attack was deemed to have been on a non-sub target.

With the end of the war in Europe Starling was earmarked for duty in the Pacific, but while re-fitting for this the war there ended. In September 1945 Starling paid off, and in October went into reserve.

Post-war service
She was modified as a Navigation training ship and remained in service for the next ten years.

In 1953 she took part in the Fleet Review to celebrate the Coronation of Queen Elizabeth II.

During her last year in commission, she visited the Norwegian fjords and the U-boat base at Kiel. Her final voyage was a call at Bootle Liverpool to attend a farewell celebration provided by the local authority and Captain Walker's widow took passage on the final sailing from Bootle to Portsmouth where she paid off.

Battle honours
 Biscay 1943
 Atlantic 1943–45
 Arctic 1944
 Normandy 1944

Successes
Starling participated in the sinking of fourteen U-boats:

The British Admiralty withdrew this credit in a post-war reassessment.

In popular culture
 Starlings service in the Arctic convoys (fictionalised as "HMS Sparrow") is described in the prologue to children's adventure novel The Salt-stained Book by Julia Jones (2011).

Notes

Sources
 Clay Blair : Hitler's U-Boat War Vol II: The Hunted 1942–1945 (1998) 
 R Gardiner, R Gray : Conway's All the World's Fighting Ships 1906–1921 (1985)  
 Arnold Hague : The Allied Convoy System 1939–1945 (2000).  (Canada);  (UK).
 Paul Kemp  : U-Boats Destroyed (1997) 
 Axel Neistle  : German U-Boat Losses during World War II  (1998). 
 Warlow, B : Battle Honours of the Royal Navy (2004) 
 Wemyss, DEG : Relentles Pursuit: The Story of Capt. FJ Walker CB.DSO***RN, U-Boat Hunter and Destroyer (2003) Cerberus Publishing  (First published in 1955)
Burn, Alan (1993). The Fighting Captain. .

Publications

External links

 HMS Starling on naval-history.net
 HMS Starling at uboat.net
 HMS Starling at britainsnavy.co.uk

 

Black Swan-class sloops
World War II sloops of the United Kingdom
Sloops of the United Kingdom
1942 ships